Lazarus Heart may refer to:
 The Lazarus Heart (novel), a novel by Poppy Z. Brite
 The Lazarus Heart (album), an album by Randy Stonehill
 "The Lazarus Heart", a song on the Sting album, ...Nothing Like the Sun
 A Lazarus heart refers to an event in which a person spontaneously returns to life (the heart starts beating again) after resuscitation has been given up.

See also
Lazarus syndrome